Frederick Daniel Pope (20 August 1909 – 1983) was a Scottish professional footballer who played in the Scottish League for Partick Thistle and Ayr United as a forward.

Career statistics

References

Scottish footballers
Brentford F.C. players
Association football inside forwards
Scottish Football League players

1909 births
1983 deaths
People from Govanhill and Crosshill
Association football outside forwards
Partick Thistle F.C. players
Blackpool F.C. players
Stockport County F.C. players
Beith F.C. players
Ayr United F.C. players